Damlabaşı is a village in the Güçlükonak District of Şırnak Province in Turkey. The village is populated by Kurds of the Harunan tribe and had a population of 416 in 2021.

References 

Villages in Güçlükonak District
Kurdish settlements in Şırnak Province